Incredible Story Studios (formerly Incredible Story Studio) was a Canadian television series which aired worldwide. The program would receive stories written by children and make a TV episode segment of the series based entirely on the written story, but only when they graded it "INCREDIBLE" (according to the show's opening sequence). The show featured two stories per episode and the beginning of each story briefly showed the author demonstrating their writing.

The episode "Hitting Them" was the launching pad for Canadian kid group Six Degrees of Bacon. It included the song "No Tattoos" and an accompanying music video.

The series was broadcast on Discovery Kids in the United States, and was also seen in Latin America as Mi guión en Discovery Kids (My Script on Discovery Kids). The show is no longer on air but its DVDs were published and distributed by Digiview Productions.

External links
 

Canadian children's education television series
1990s Canadian children's television series
2000s Canadian children's television series
1997 Canadian television series debuts
2001 Canadian television series endings
English-language television shows
Television shows filmed in Regina, Saskatchewan
YTV (Canadian TV channel) original programming